Group A of the Copa América Centenario consisted of hosts United States, Colombia, Costa Rica, and Paraguay. Matches began on 3 June and ended on 11 June 2016. All times are EDT (UTC−4).

The United States and Colombia advanced to the quarter-finals.

Teams

Notes

Standings

In the quarter-finals:
The winner of Group A, United States, advanced to play the runner-up of Group B, Ecuador.
The runner-up of Group A, Colombia, advanced to play the winner of Group B, Peru.

Matches

United States vs Colombia
The two teams had met in seventeen previous encounters, the last being a friendly held in 2014 at Craven Cottage in London, a match won by Colombia 2–1. Both teams had also met in two Copa América editions: the 1995 third-place match, won by Colombia 4–1, and in a group stage match in 2007, also won by Colombia, with a lone goal by Jaime Castrillón.

Colombia won the match 0–2 with first-half goals scored by Cristián Zapata and James Rodríguez. United States' manager Jürgen Klinsmann stated that he was "pleased" with the performance of his team, he also saw the penalty as the "major point of the game", a remark to which American player Clint Dempsey agreed. Colombia's manager José Pekerman recognized the competitiveness of their rivals, but commented that "we could have scored a couple more."

Costa Rica vs Paraguay
The two teams had met in eight previous occasions, the last being a friendly in the Costa Rican national stadium in March 2015, resulting in a scoreless draw. In Copa América, both teams faced once, in a 2004 group stage match, won by Paraguay with a late penalty kick goal scored by Julio dos Santos.

Just as their previous friendly meeting, the game ended in a scoreless draw. Costa Rican manager Óscar Ramírez commented that it was "a two-faced match" and that "I would say we have lost two points". Paraguay's manager Ramón Díaz also though that his team lost two points; he was also critical of the hour chosen for the game, commenting that "I would like to take the actual protagonists, the players, in consideration".

Costa Rican player Kendall Waston was shown the red card in the stoppage time after a tackle against Nelson Valdez, becoming the first player to be sent-off in the tournament. Regarding the incident, Waston commented, "when I saw the red card I felt the world coming over me, because this tournament is very short and we all want to play".

United States vs Costa Rica
The two teams had met in thirty-three previous occasions, the last being a friendly held at the Red Bull Arena in Harrison, New Jersey, won by the Costa Rican side with a lone goal by Joel Campbell. This marked the first time both teams faced each other in a competitive match outside of CONCACAF official competitions. Before the match, the President of the United States Soccer Federarion (USSF) Sunil Gulati was interviewed on the status of U.S. manager Jurgen Klinsmann, saying, "Results are what matter. Everyone understands that. Results of the last 18 months, overall, haven't been what we would have hoped for. Especially in the official competitions." Many pundits took this to mean that Klinsmann's job was in jeopardy.

The United States got off to a flying start, with Bobby Wood drawing a penalty in the 9th minute that was converted by Clint Dempsey. Two other first half goals were scored by Wood and Jermaine Jones, and the scoring was finished by Graham Zusi late in the 2nd half. Zusi's goal would prove crucial in the long run, with the United States going on to win the group on goal difference.

Colombia vs Paraguay
The two teams had met in forty-two previous occasions, the last being a 2014 FIFA World Cup qualifying match held in Asunción, which the Colombian side won 2–1. In Copa América editions, they had not faced each other since a 2007 Copa América group stage match, won by Paraguay 5–0.

United States vs Paraguay
The two teams had met in six previous occasions, the last being a friendly held at LP Field in 2011, won by Paraguay with a lone goal by Óscar Cardozo. In Copa América, they have faced once, a Paraguayan 3–1 victory in a 2007 group stage match. U.S. scored first, once again from Clint Dempsey on a cross from Gyasi Zardes. It would be the only goal of the game, but U.S. would not win without difficulty.

Early in the second half, DeAndre Yedlin was sent off following two yellow cards in quick succession, giving Paraguay a man advantage for almost 40 minutes. However, the United States defense held firm, mostly due to the efforts of John Brooks and Geoff Cameron. Following a shock victory by Costa Rica over Colombia, the United States ended up winning Group A.

Colombia vs Costa Rica
The two teams had met in eleven previous occasions, the last being a friendly held at the Estadio Diego Armando Maradona in Buenos Aires in 2015, won by Colombia with a lone goal by Radamel Falcao. In Copa América, they have faced three times, with Colombia emerging victorious in every single occasion, including the last in 2011, with a goal scored by Adrián Ramos.

References

External links
CONCACAF standings

Group A
2016 in American soccer
2015–16 in Costa Rican football
2016 in Colombian football
2016 in Paraguayan football